Bashar Omar (born 14 March 1979) is a Kuwaiti middle-distance runner. He competed in the men's 3000 metres steeplechase at the 2004 Summer Olympics.

References

External links
 

1979 births
Living people
Athletes (track and field) at the 2004 Summer Olympics
Kuwaiti male middle-distance runners
Kuwaiti male steeplechase runners
Olympic athletes of Kuwait
Place of birth missing (living people)